Paul Evan Stewart (born 29 October 1965 in Dumbarton, Scotland) is a former racing driver and the son of three-times Formula One World Champion Jackie Stewart. Stewart competed in Formula Ford 2000 in 1988, the British Formula 3 Championship from 1989 to 1990 and in Formula 3000 from 1991 to 1993, both for his Paul Stewart Racing team. During the period, he was a teammate of Marco Apicella in 1991, David Coulthard in 1992 and Gil de Ferran in 1993. De Ferran won the first victory for the team in 1993. Thereafter, Stewart gave up his career as a driver and decided to concentrate on his role as team manager from 1994. The team won eight team championships in F3, 1992 to 1994, and 1996 to 2000.

Early life
Paul Stewart was born in Scotland but moved to Switzerland before he was three and lived near many other racing drivers, including Jochen Rindt and Jo Bonnier. He learned to drive sitting on his father's knee, steering cars up and down the drive. Stewart was educated at Aiglon College and Duke University in North Carolina, where he read political science. His father had agreed to consider helping his motorsport career if he graduated. He worked in financial institutions in New York and Switzerland during the holidays until the summer when he would graduate. He signed up to and paid for it himself for a racing course at Brands Hatch under the name of Robin Congdon to make sure he got an honest assessment.

Racing career
After the course Paul went back to his father Jackie Stewart and said he wanted to go racing and while Jackie did not like the idea at all, he did not want other people involved in his son's career. So they started working together, and formed Paul Stewart Racing. Paul Stewart signed up to do Junior Formula Ford 1600 in the summer of 1987, he led some races and had some second places. Paul Stewart Racing came into existence in 1988, fielding a FF2000 sporting Camel sponsorship, with the assistance of Jackie's former mechanic Roy Topp and James Skilling. Paul won the next race at Cadwell Park and got the budget for Formula 3 racing. In Formula 3, Stewart came up against future F1 and Indycar drivers: Mika Häkkinen, David Coulthard, Gil de Ferran and Kenny Bräck. Paul won at Snetterton in strange circumstances. "I was leading, came up against a backmarker who looked like he was going to move one way as we were going into Russell, back when it was a proper, flat-out corner. In fact he went the other way. I spun and crossed the line backwards but the race was then red-flagged because Mika Hakkinen had just had a huge accident at the Bombhole and I won it on countback". That win earned him a place on the grid at the year end Macau Grand Prix where he qualified third and earned the title of best newcomer. Stewart did three seasons of F3000 with Marco Apicella, Coulthard and de Ferran as his team-mates. His best finish was third at the Pau Grand Prix in 1993. Despite testing for Footwork, he stopped racing and focus on his team.

Personal life
Stewart married his wife Victoria in 1993 and has four sons.

Health
In September 1999, Stewart was diagnosed with ulcerative colitis. A second colonoscopy in January 2000, did not detect cancerous cells. Further problems arose after Stewart was diagnosed with bowel cancer in April 2000. Upon hearing the news, he stepped down as Chief Operating Officer for Jaguar Racing and subsequently travelled to the Mayo Clinic in the U.S. for treatment. A CAT scan showed no signs of cancer returning.

Career summary

See also
 List of people diagnosed with ulcerative colitis

References

External links
 Profile, Grandprix.com

Scottish racing drivers
British Formula Three Championship drivers
1965 births
Living people
International Formula 3000 drivers
Scottish motorsport people
Formula One team owners
Sportspeople from Dumbarton
Paul Stewart Racing drivers
Duke University alumni
Alumni of Aiglon College